Clear Springs or Clear Spring may refer to:

Clear Spring, Indiana, an unincorporated community
Clear Springs, Kentucky, an unincorporated community
Clear Spring, Maryland, a town
Clear Springs, Missouri, an unincorporated community
Clear Springs, Texas, an unincorporated community